A Diving Competition for men and women took place at the 1987 Pan American Games, held from August 7 to August 23, 1987 in Indianapolis, United States. There were two events each for men and women. Events were held at the Indiana University Natatorium.

Men's competition

3m Springboard

10m Platform

Women's competition

3m Springboard

10m Platform

Medal table

See also
 Diving at the 1988 Summer Olympics

References
 Sports 123

1987
Events at the 1987 Pan American Games
1987 in diving